Bashtin (also Romanized as Bashtīn) is a village in Mehran Rural District, in the Central District of Bandar Lengeh County, Hormozgan Province, Iran. At the 2006 census, its population was 27, in 6 families.

References 

Populated places in Bandar Lengeh County